Events from the year 1775 in France.

Incumbents 
Monarch: Louis XVI

Events
April–May – Flour War: riots against bread prices.
Probable date – Jeanne Baret returns to France, becoming the first woman to complete a circumnavigation of the globe.

Births

January to June
20 January – André-Marie Ampère, physicist (died 1836)
1 February – Philippe de Girard, engineer and inventor of the first flax spinning frame (died 1845)
3 February
Maximilien Sebastien Foy, military leader, statesman and writer (died 1825).
Louis-François, Baron Lejeune, general, painter and lithographer (died 1848).
30 April – Guillaume Dode de la Brunerie, Marshal of France (died 1851).
10 May – Antoine Charles Louis Lasalle, cavalry general (killed in battle) (died 1809).

July to December
3 July – Antoine Philippe, Duke of Montpensier, younger brother of Louis-Philippe of France (died 1807).
23 July – Eugène François Vidocq, criminal, later first director of Sûreté Nationale (died 1857).
6 August – Louis-Antoine, Duke of Angoulême, last Dauphin of France (died 1844).
22 August – François Péron, naturalist and explorer (died 1810).
1 September – Honoré Charles Reille, Marshal of France (died 1860).
11 November – Jean Guillaume Audinet-Serville, entomologist (died 1858).
30 November – Jean Joseph Antoine de Courvoisier, magistrate and politician (died 1835).
10 December – Jacques-Antoine Manuel, politician and orator (died 1827).
16 December – François-Adrien Boieldieu, composer (died 1834).

Full date unknown
Charles Berny d'Ouvillé, miniaturist (died 1842).

Deaths

January to June 
 5 March – Pierre-Laurent Buirette de Belloy, actor/playwright (born 1727)
 27 May – Louise Élisabeth de Bourbon (born 1693)

July to December
 6 September – Jean-Baptiste Bullet, scholar (born 1699)
 26 October – Pierre-Edmé Babel, engraver (born 1720)
 1 November – Pierre-Joseph Bernard, poet (born 1708)
 6 November – Guillaume de Barrême de Châteaufort, painter (born 1719)

Full date unknown
 Nicolas La Grange, playwright and translator (born 1707)

In literature
 The historical fiction A Tale of Two Cities (1859) by English novelist Charles Dickens opens in this year ("It was the best of times; it was the worst of times"); it is the story of London and Paris leading up to the French Revolution.

See also

References

1770s in France